Estriol phosphate (E3P), or estriol 17β-phosphate, also known as estra-1,3,5(10)-triene-3,16α,17β-triol 17β-(dihydrogen phosphate), is an estrogen which was never marketed. It is an estrogen ester, specifically an ester of estriol with phosphoric acid, and acts as a prodrug of estriol by cleavage via phosphatase enzymes in the body. Estriol phosphate is contained within the chemical structure of polyestriol phosphate (a polymer of estriol phosphate), and this medication has been marketed for medical use (brand names Gynäsan, Klimadurin, Triodurin).

See also
 List of estrogen esters § Estriol esters

References

Abandoned drugs
Estriol esters
Phosphate esters
Prodrugs
Synthetic estrogens